Arad or ARAD may refer to:

People
 Arad (given name)
 Arad (surname)

Places and jurisdictions

Bahrain
 Arad, Bahrain, a village in Al Muharraq Governorate
 Arad Fort, located on Arad shore
 Arad Island, a former member of the Bahrain Islands, now joined to Muharraq

Iran
 Arad, Iran, a city in Fars Province, Iran
 Arad District, an administrative subdivision of Fars Province
 Arad Rural District, an administrative subdivision of Fars Province
 Arad General Hospital in Tehran, Iran
 Arad, Tehran, a village in Tehran Province, Iran

Israel 
 Arad, Israel, a city in Israel
 Tel Arad, the remains of the ancient city of Arad

Jordan
 Arad (see), an Ancient city and bishopric in (Trans)Jordan, near Tell 'Arad, now a Latin Catholic titular see

Romania
 Arad, Romania, the main city of Arad County
 Arad County, at the western edge of Transylvania (Crişana-Banat), Romania
 Arad County (former), a historical county, first Kingdom of Hungary, Austro-Hungarian Empire, later in Romania
 Arad Region, an administrative division of the People's Republic of Romania 1950–1956
 Archdiocese of Arad, an episcopal see of the Romanian Orthodox Church

Other uses
 ARAD (Sumerogram), a letter in Sumerian cuneiform
 CFR Arad, a Romanian football club 1921–1985
 F.C. Arad, an Israeli football club